Klatovy District is a district in the Plzeň Region of the Czech Republic. Its capital is the town of Klatovy. With its area of  it is the largest district in the Czech Republic.

Administrative division
Klatovy District is divided into three administrative districts of municipalities with extended competence: Klatovy, Horažďovice and Sušice.

List of municipalities
Towns are marked in bold and market towns in italics:

Běhařov -
Běšiny -
Bezděkov -
Biřkov -
Bolešiny -
Břežany -
Budětice -
Bukovník -
Čachrov -
Černíkov -
Červené Poříčí -
Chanovice -
Chlistov -
Chudenice -
Chudenín -
Číhaň -
Čímice -
Dešenice -
Dlažov -
Dlouhá Ves -
Dobršín -
Dolany -
Domoraz -
Dražovice -
Frymburk -
Hamry -
Hartmanice -
Hejná -
Hlavňovice -
Hnačov -
Horažďovice -
Horská Kvilda -
Hrádek -
Hradešice -
Janovice nad Úhlavou -
Javor -
Ježovy -
Kašperské Hory -
Kejnice -
Klatovy -
Klenová -
Kolinec -
Kovčín -
Křenice -
Kvášňovice -
Lomec -
Malý Bor -
Maňovice -
Měčín -
Mezihoří -
Mlýnské Struhadlo -
Modrava -
Mochtín -
Mokrosuky -
Myslív -
Myslovice -
Nalžovské Hory -
Nehodiv -
Nezamyslice -
Nezdice na Šumavě -
Nýrsko -
Obytce -
Olšany -
Ostřetice -
Pačejov -
Petrovice u Sušice -
Plánice -
Podmokly -
Poleň -
Prášily -
Předslav -
Rabí -
Rejštejn -
Slatina -
Soběšice -
Srní -
Strašín -
Strážov -
Sušice -
Svéradice -
Švihov -
Tužice -
Týnec -
Újezd u Plánice -
Velhartice -
Velké Hydčice -
Velký Bor -
Vrhaveč -
Vřeskovice -
Zavlekov -
Zborovy -
Železná Ruda -
Žichovice -
Žihobce

Geography

It borders Germany in the southwest. The landscape is very rugged. Most of the territory has a foothill character, but along the state border, the landscape is mountainous, and in the northeast, the terrain is only slightly undulating. The territory extends into five geomorphological mesoregions: Bohemian Forest Foothills (centre and east), Bohemian Forest (south and southwest), Blatná Uplands (northeast), Švihov Highlands (northwest) and Cham-Furth Depression (small part in the west).

The area is rich in rivers. Both sources of the Otava River, Křemelná and Vydra, originate here. The Otava then continues to flow across the eastern part of the district. Similarly important is the Úhlava, which also springs here and flows through the western part of the district. The other important rives that springs here are Regen and Úslava.

Two of the few natural lakes in the country, Černé and Čertovo, lie within the district.

In the south is located a large part of the Šumava National Park. The territory in the southwest falls under the protection of the Šumava Protected Landscape Area.

Most populated municipalities

Economy
The largest employers with its headquarters in Klatovy District and at least 500 employers are:

Transport
There are no motorways passing through the district. The most important road is the I/27 (part of European route E53) from Plzeň to the Czech-German border via Klatovy.

Sights

The most important monuments in the district, protected as national cultural monuments, are:
Rabí Castle
Švihov Castle
Velhartice Castle
Červené Poříčí Castle
Týnec Castle

The best-preserved settlements and landscapes, protected as monument reservations and monument zones, are:

Dobršín (monument reservation)
Horažďovice
Kašperské Hory
Klatovy
Rabí
Strážov
Sušice
Velhartice
Břežany
Hradešice
Chanovice
Ostřetice
Poleň
Velké Hydčice
Chudenicko landscape

Five of the ten most visited tourist destinations of the Plzeň Region are located in Klatovy District. The most visited tourist destinations are the Rabí Castle, Velhartice Castle, Klenová Castle, Kašperk Castle and Švihov Castle.

References

External links

Klatovy District profile on the Czech Statistical Office's website

 
Districts of the Czech Republic